Dinty may refer to:

People 
 William Colbeck (gangster) (1890–1943), American politician and organized crime figure
 Dinty Gearin (1897–1959), American baseball player
 Dinty Moore (American football) (born 1903), American football player
 Dinty W. Moore (born 1955), American essayist
 Francis Moore (ice hockey) (1900–1976), Canadian hockey player
 John "Dinty" Moore, a player in the 1932–33 St. Louis Soccer League season

Other uses 
 Dinty (film), a 1920 American silent film
 Dinty Moore, a character in Bringing Up Father, an American comic strip which ran from 1913 to 2000
 DINTY, a system of labelling for tetrads in the Ordnance Survey

Lists of people by nickname